This is a list of Ivorian writers.

 Josette Abondio (b. 1949), novelist, children's writer, playwright
 Marguerite Abouet, born in Abidjan (b. 1971), writer of graphic novels
 Francois-Joseph Amon d'Aby (1913–2007)
 Raphael Atta Koffi (b. 1942), writer and playwright
 Séry Bailly (1948–2018), academic, politician and short-story writer
 Angèle Bassorá-Ouédraogo, also connected with Burkina Faso (b. 1967), poet and journalist
 Joseph Miezan Bognini (b. 1936), poet
 Tanella Boni (b. 1954), poet and novelist
 Micheline Coulibaly, born in Vietnam (1950–2003), short story writer and writer for children
 Bernard Binlin Dadié (1916–2019), novelist, playwright, poet and politician 
 Jeanne de Cavally (1926–1992), children's book writer
 Gaston Demand Goh (b. 1940), playwright and accountant
 Henriette Diabate (b. 1935), politician and writer
 Mamadou Diallo (b. 1920), poet
 Richard Dogbeh, also connected with Benin, Senegal and Togo (1932–2003), novelist and educator
 Bertin B. Doutéo (b. 1927), poet
 Germain Coffi Gadeau (1913–2000), playwright
 Werewere-Liking Gnepo (b. 1950), also connected with Cameroon, writer, playwright and performer
 Gilbert G. Groud (b. 1956), painter, illustrator and author
 Josué Guébo (b. 1972), poet and short-story writer
 Flore Hazoumé (b. 1959), writer known for short stories 
Simone Kaya (1937–2007), considered the first Ivorian woman writer 

 Fatou Kéita (b. 1965)
 Venance Konan (b. 1958), journalist and writer
 Maurice Koné (b. 1932), poet
 Adjoua Flore Kouame (b. 1964), novelist
 Ahmadou Kourouma (1927–2003), novelist 
 Lauryn
 Aké Loba (1927–2012), novelist
 Michelle Lora (b. 1968), children's writer, academic
 Charles Nokan (1936–2022), novelist and playwright
 Véronique Tadjo (b. 1955), poet, novelist and artist
 Regina Yaou (1955–2017), novelist
 Zaourou Zadi (b. 1938), playwright

See also 
 List of African writers by country

References 

Ivorian
Writers
Ivorian